Bucculatrix noltei is a moth in the family Bucculatricidae. It is found from Finland to Belgium, Italy and the Crimea and from the Netherlands to Central Russia. It was described by August Arthur Petry in 1912.

The wingspan is 5–6 mm. The forewings are sandy brown, with both darker and lighter bands. Adults are on wing from April to May and again from July to August in two generations per year.

The larvae feed on Artemisia vulgaris. They mine the leaves of their host plant. The mine starts as a slender corridor, mostly along the leaf margin. Here, there is a broad, continuous, reddish brown frass line. Later, the larva leaves the mine and lives freely on the leaf, creating fleck mines. Larvae can be found from June to October. The species overwinters in the pupal stage.

References

Natural History Museum Lepidoptera generic names catalog

External links
Lepiforum.de

Moths described in 1912
Bucculatricidae
Moths of Europe
Leaf miners